Griffin Colapinto (born July 29, 1998, in Mission Viejo, California) is an American professional surfer. In 2017, Colapinto won the prestigious Vans Triple Crown of Surfing event. That same year, he also won the Men's Qualifying Series and qualified for the World Surf League (WCT) surfing. Griffin also has a younger brother, whose name is Crosby. Crosby is also a surfer. Colapinto did his best WSL performance in 2022 where he finished 7th on the final rankings.

Background and early years 

While peers have been admiring him for years, Griffin's first big public shot across the bow came in November 2016, when he landed a Hail Mary aerial-reverse in the high-stakes Hawaiian Pro at Haleiwa. He followed with a runner-up finish to Ethan Ewing at the World Junior Championships, then made the Final of the Volcom Pipe Pro to start his steady climb up the Qualifying Series ranks. In 2017, he became the first Californian to win the prestigious Vans Triple Crown of Surfing after making back-to-back Finals at Haleiwa and Sunset Beach. In addition, he finished the season as the 2017 Qualifying Series champion.

Career Victories

References

External links
  Profile @ World Surf League

1998 births
Living people
People from San Clemente, California
American surfers
World Surf League surfers